Goodenia symonii is a species of flowering plant in the family Goodeniaceae and is endemic to the northern part of the Northern Territory. It is a herb with prostrate to erect branches, lance-shaped leaves with the narrower end towards the base, and racemes of purplish or reddish flowers.

Description

Taxonomy and naming
This species was first formally described in 1979 by Roger Charles Carolin who gave it the name Calogyne symonii in the journal Brunonia from material collected by David Symon in 1972. In 1990, Carolin changed the name to Goodenia symonii in the journal Telopea.

Distribution and habitat
This goodenia grows in seasonally wet soil in the north of the Northern Territory.

Conservation status
Goodenia symonii is classified as "least concern" under the Northern Territory Government Territory Parks and Wildlife Conservation Act 1976.

References

symonii
Flora of the Northern Territory
Plants described in 1979
Taxa named by Roger Charles Carolin
Endemic flora of Australia